Wayne McLaren (born Lawrence Gilbert McLaren, September 12, 1940 – July 22, 1992) was an American stuntman, model, actor, and rodeo performer.

Biography
McLaren worked as a stuntman and rodeo rider before being hired to appear in ads for Marlboro. McLaren competed in bronc riding and bull riding events. In 1976, he did promotional work for the famous Marlboro cigarette advertising campaign as the "Marlboro Man".

After developing lung cancer in 1990, McLaren became an anti-smoking crusader citing his 30-year smoking habit as the cause of his cancer. During the time of McLaren's anti-smoking activism, Philip Morris denied that McLaren ever appeared in a Marlboro ad. In response, McLaren produced an affidavit from a talent agency that had represented him and a pay check stub asserting that he had been paid for work on a "Marlboro print" job.

Just before his death, a television spot was filmed showing images of him appearing as the cowboy juxtaposed with those of him on his hospital bed; his brother, Charles McLaren, gave a voiceover about the dangers of smoking, and noted that the tobacco industry promoted an 'independent lifestyle' before finally summarizing, 'Lying there with all those tubes in you, how independent can you really be?'

Filmography

References

External links

 
 

Male actors from Louisiana
American male film actors
Male models from Louisiana
American male television actors
Deaths from lung cancer in California
American stunt performers
Tobacco advertising
1940 births
1992 deaths
20th-century American male actors
Bronc riders
Bull riders